Javier Lozano Chavira (born 9 February 1971) is a Mexican former professional footballer. He played for Tigres UANL and Monarcas Morelia as a midfielder. He is nicknamed "El Pastor", which means "The Shepherd". He played in both teams with the number 22.

He debuted with Tigres in 1992. His most notable season was 1995–96, when he scored 12 goals. That year, Tigres fought to avoid relegation to the Primera División A. Though Tigres qualified to the playoffs at the end of the regular season, the Primera Division's use of a percentage system for relegation, in which the team with the worst percentage in three years (instead of the worst team of a season) is relegated, meant Tigres would still be dropping to the Primera División A. The crisis led to the privatization of the team.

After privatization, Tigres reinforced the team to fight for promotion, which was achieved within the year. "El Pastor" Lozano participated fully with the team. He played in First Division with Tigres the following season as well.

However, overweight issues led to his separation of the team. He trained with Necaxa for a short period, but was never able to regain his condition.

In 1999, he returned to play with Morelia for 6 seasons, in which he scored a total of 13 goals. He was champion with Morelia in 2000 and runner-up in 2002.

Honours
UANL
Primera División A: Invierno 1996, Verano 1997
Copa México: 1995–96

Morelia
Mexican Primera División: Invierno 2000

Mexico
CONCACAF Gold Cup: 1998

Career statistics

International goals

Scores and results list Mexico's goal tally first.

References

External links
 

1971 births
Living people
Footballers from Nuevo León
Tigres UANL footballers
Atlético Morelia players
Sportspeople from Monterrey
Association football midfielders
1998 CONCACAF Gold Cup players
Mexico international footballers
Mexican footballers